Prince Ferdinand may refer to:

Ferdinand I of León and Castile (1017-1065)
Ferdinand II of León (1137-188)
Ferdinand, Count of Flanders (1188-1233)
Ferdinand III of Castile (1199-1252)
Prince Fernando, Lord of Serpa (after 1217 - ca. 1243)
Ferdinand de la Cerda (1253-1275)
Ferdinand IV of Castile (1285-1312)
Ferdinand I of Aragon (1380-1416)
Ferdinand the Saint Prince (1402-1443)
Ferdinand I of Naples (1423-1494)
Infante Ferdinand, Duke of Viseu (1433-1470)
Ferdinand II of Aragon (1452-1516)
Ferdinand II of Naples (1469-1496)
Ferdinand I, Holy Roman Emperor (1503-1564)
Infante Ferdinand, Duke of Guarda and Trancoso (1507-1534)
Ferdinand, Prince of Asturias (1571-1578)
Ferdinand of Bavaria (archbishop) (1577-1650)
Ferdinand Maximilian, Hereditary Prince of Baden-Baden (1625-1669)
Ferdinand IV, King of the Romans (1633-1654)
Ferdinand VI of Spain (1713-1759)
Ferdinand, Duke of Parma (1751-1802)
Ferdinand I of the Two Sicilies (1751-1825)
Ferdinand, 5th Prince Kinsky of Wchinitz and Tettau (1781-1812)
Ferdinand VII of Spain (1784-1833)
Prince Ferdinand of Saxe-Coburg and Gotha (1785-1851)
Ferdinand, Hereditary Prince of Denmark (1792-1863)
Ferdinand I of Austria (1793-1875)
Prince Ferdinand Philippe, Duke of Orléans (1810-1842)
Ferdinand II of the Two Sicilies (1810-1859)
Ferdinand II of Portugal (1816-1885)
Prince Ferdinand, Duke of Genoa (1822–1855)
Ferdinand Bonaventura, 7th Prince Kinsky of Wchinitz and Tettau (1834-1904)
Prince Ferdinand, Duke of Alençon (1844-1910)
Infante Ferdinand of Portugal (1846-1861)
Ferdinand I of Bulgaria (1861-1948)
Ferdinand of Romania (1865-1927)
Prince Ferdinand Pius, Duke of Calabria (1869-1960)
Prince Ferdinand, Duke of Montpensier (1884-1924)
Prince Ferdinand of Bavaria (1884-1958)
Prince Ferdinando, Duke of Genoa (1884-1963)
Prince Ferdinand, Duke of Castro (1926-2008)
Ferdinand von Bismarck (born 1930)
Archduke Ferdinand Zvonimir of Austria (born 1997)